Serafín Garcia Menocal was the President of the Consejo Nacional Scouts de Cuba (National Council) of the Asociación de Scouts de Cuba.

In 1956, under his leadership, the Scouts of Cuba bought the national training ground Campo Escuela Nacional Mayabeque close to the Mayabeque River, near Catalina de Güines in Havana Province, within 50 km of the capital.

Published works
The Lesson the United States Can Learn from Cuba. (Princeton, NJ: Princeton UP) (New York:  MM Wilson) International relations. US relations. Cuba. A speech of 3 January 1964.

External links

Scouting and Guiding in Cuba
Possibly living people
Year of birth missing